A covered hopper is a self-clearing enclosed railroad freight car with fixed roof, sides, and ends with openings for loading through the roof and bottom openings for unloading. Covered hopper cars are designed for carrying dry bulk loads, varying from grain to products such as sand and clay. The cover protects the loads from the weather. Dry cement would be very hard to unload if mixed with water in transit, while grain would be likely to rot if exposed to rain.

History 
While hoppers had long been used to carry mined products like coal, ore, and gravel; boxcars were used for granular materials requiring protection from moisture until waterproof covers were devised for hopper cars. Gravity flow through the bottom of the hopper car simplifies unloading granular bulk commodities. Although removable canvas covers are sometimes used to protect moisture sensitive commodities in open hopper cars, a metal top with waterproof loading hatches provides superior protection. These loading hatches along the top of the covered hopper may be a single long opening along the centerline or a pattern of multiple round or square openings positioned to allow uniform weight distribution when loading the car.

Some covered hoppers have two to four separated bays. Each of these can be loaded and emptied individually, with access at the top to load the materials and visible chutes at the bottom for unloading. Early production emphasized two-bay cars very similar to open coal hoppers and suitable for materials of similar density, like Portland cement or rock-salt. Some cars were available in the 1910s, and became more common by the 1940s. These early cars were volume-limited for less dense commodities like grain or sugar, so later designs include longer covered hopper cars with higher sides and three or more bottom bays. Increasing axle load limits have allowed some of the heavier loads formerly assigned to two-bay hoppers to be assigned to larger, more efficient three-bay hoppers.

Some covered hopper cars retain the conventional centersill as a strength member transmitting compression and tension forces from one car to the next. Beginning in the 1960s, designs distributing these forces along the sides of the car eliminated the centersill beam to simplify bulk material handling with wider hopper openings reducing the tendency for bridging to restrict gravity flow when unloading the car.
 
Large unit trains of various grain crops are a common sight in North America, reaching up to 125 cars long. These predominantly haul grain from the large farming areas of the Great Plains to various markets, but a number of unit trains originate from other major farming areas, such as Illinois and Indiana as well as the Canadian provinces of Alberta, Saskatchewan and Manitoba. These trains may originate from a single grain elevator, or may be marshaled in a yard from various locals (short trains which serve nearby industries). The destinations tend to be large flour mills or ports (for export), or they may be split up and delivered to multiple locations. The empty cars may return as a whole train, or may be sent back in smaller quantities on manifest trains (trains which carry just about any type of freight). These trains are used primarily for hauling products such as corn, wheat and barley.

References

External links 
 Guide to Rail Cars

Freight rolling stock